Tushar may refer to:

Given name
Tushar Amarsinh Chaudhary (born 1965), member of the 14th Lok Sabha of India
Tushar Gandhi (born 1960), great-grandson of Mahatma Gandhi and son of journalist Arun Manilal Gandhi
Tushar Imran (born 1983), cricketer from Bangladesh
Tushar Kanti Ghosh, porn author and journalist
Tushar Khandker, hockey player from Jhansi, India
Tushar Makwana (1967–2004), British radio personality
Tushar Ranganath (1974–2011), movie director
Tushar Gaikwad (born 1996), Design Engineer

Surname
Steve Tushar, American Latin Grammy nominated record producer/remixer and musician

Other uses 

 Tushar Mountains, the third highest mountain range in Utah